The Battle of Cedar Creek was fought near Middletown, Virginia on October 19, 1864. The battle was the decisive engagement of Major General Philip Sheridan’s Valley Campaigns of 1864 and was the largest battle fought in the Shenandoah Valley. Twelve Union Army enlisted men and nine officers were awarded the Medal of Honor for gallantry during the battle.

The Medal of Honor was created during the American Civil War and is the highest military decoration presented by the United States government to a member of its armed forces. The recipient must have distinguished themselves at the risk of their own life above and beyond the call of duty in action against an enemy of the United States. Due to the nature of this medal, it is commonly presented posthumously.

Recipients

Notes

References

 
 
 

Battle of Cedar Creek
American Civil War-related lists
Virginia-related lists